The desmogleins are a family of desmosomal cadherins consisting of proteins DSG1, DSG2, DSG3, and DSG4. They play a role in the formation of desmosomes that join cells to one another.

Pathology
Desmogleins are targeted in the autoimmune disease pemphigus.

Desmoglein proteins are a type of cadherin, which is a transmembrane protein that binds with other cadherins to form junctions known as desmosomes between cells. These desmoglein proteins thus hold cells together, but, when the body starts producing antibodies against desmoglein, these junctions break down, and this results in subsequent blister or vesicle formation.

References

External links
 
 

Cadherins
Single-pass transmembrane proteins
Protein families